RMIT's School of Education is an Australian tertiary education school within the College of Design and Social Context at the Royal Melbourne Institute of Technology (RMIT University), located in Melbourne, Victoria.

See also
RMIT University

References

External links
School of Education

Education
Teachers colleges in Australia